Cityplace/Uptown station (formerly Cityplace station) is a DART Light Rail station located in Dallas, Texas. It is located beneath North Central Expressway (US 75) at Haskell Avenue in the Cityplace district. As an infill DART station, it opened on December 18, 2000 as the first public subway station in the Southwest (the Tandy Center Subway in Fort Worth, though open to the public, was a privately owned light rail).

The station is tri-level in design, reaching depths of  beneath North Central Expressway. The south end of the platforms are reached from the surface via stairs, three pairs of escalators, or elevators (3 traditional and 2 inclined elevators). The east entrance is located at the base of Tower at Cityplace, serving that tower and surrounding retail. The west entrance serves West Village, the M-line Trolley and Uptown area. Original station plans allowed for another set of entrances at the north end of the platforms, which could serve future development north of Haskell Boulevard.

Cityplace remains the only underground station on the DART rail system (the nearby Knox-Henderson station was deferred after community opposition, and subway stations built under the D2 Subway project are still in the planning stage). The other two remaining stations for the tunnel are Pearl/Arts District and Mockingbird. Both of these stations are outside the tunnel.

On July 30, 2012, Cityplace station was renamed as Cityplace/Uptown station as part of the service changes effective for that date to better reflect new identities created by their evolving neighborhoods or surrounding developments.

References

External links
Dallas Area Rapid Transit - Cityplace Station
DART Train departing CityPlace Station
photo, view from inclined elevator

Dallas Area Rapid Transit light rail stations in Dallas
Railway stations in the United States opened in 2000
2000 establishments in Texas
Railway stations located underground in the United States
Railway stations in Dallas County, Texas